Mount Rose Station is a proposed hotel and casino located at the intersection of Herz Boulevard and Mount Rose Highway next to The Summit in Reno, Nevada.

The building design is similar to Aliante (formerly known as Aliante Station), Green Valley Ranch and Red Rock Resort.

References

External links
  (archive)

Casinos in Reno, Nevada
Hotels in Reno, Nevada
Station Casinos